The Perfume Shop is a United Kingdom perfume retailer founded in 1992 and owned by A.S. Watson (Health & Beauty UK) Ltd, which is part of the A.S. Watson Group. The A.S. Watson Group acquired The Perfume Shop in 2005. The company is based in High Wycombe, Buckinghamshire, with a distribution centre in Dunstable. It is the second largest fragrance retailer in the UK.

History
The Perfume Shop started in 1992. When bought by Merchant Retail Group plc in 1991, it was originally called EauZone. Eauzone had six stores but three were closed down immediately, with only Guildford, Portsmouth and Basingstoke being retained. That year, The Perfume Shop also opened in Meadowhall, Sheffield and The Glades Shopping Centre, Bromley (now Intu). Typically, The Perfume Shop trades from smaller shops than many other retailers and they averaged 400 square feet. Half of their sales came in the six weeks before Christmas. It became a classic brick and mortar operation with both high street shops and a website.

The Perfume Shop @ Superdrug
, it has operated a shop in shop concept at Superdrug stores. The project was initially trialled with 11 stores including Aylesbury, Milton Keynes, Bury, Glasgow, and Westfield London.

Rewards Club
In September 2011, it launched a loyalty card scheme named ‘Rewards Club’.

References

External links
 Official website

AS Watson
CK Hutchison Holdings
Retail companies of the United Kingdom
Perfume houses
Retail companies established in 1992
Companies based in Buckinghamshire